A Nightmare on Elm Street 2: Freddy's Revenge (stylized on-screen as A Nightmare on Elm Street Part 2: Freddy's Revenge) is a 1985 American supernatural slasher film directed by Jack Sholder and written by David Chaskin. It stars Mark Patton, Kim Myers, Robert Englund as Freddy Krueger, and Robert Rusler. It is the second installment in the A Nightmare on Elm Street franchise. The film follows Jesse Walsh, a teenager who begins having recurring nightmares about Freddy Krueger after moving into the former home of Nancy Thompson from the first film.

Freddy's Revenge was released on November 1, 1985, and grossed $30 million at the domestic box office on a budget of $3 million. It received mixed reviews from critics upon release, with many comparing it unfavorably to its predecessor. However, it has enjoyed later success as a cult classic, with critics having reassessed the film's homoerotic themes and subject material. It was distributed by New Line Cinema. The film was followed by A Nightmare on Elm Street 3: Dream Warriors (1987).

Plot
Five years after Freddy Krueger's apparent defeat, the Walshes have moved into Nancy Thompson's former home. Their teenage son, Jesse, has a nightmare about being stalked by Krueger driving a school bus. He wakes up and attributes the dream to the unusual heat in the room. Jesse goes to school with his friend Lisa, whom he is interested in romantically, but is too shy to flirt with her. After getting into a fight with a boy named Grady during gym class, Coach Schneider has them stay after class and they become friends. Lisa comes to visit Jesse after school and they discover Nancy Thompson's diary detailing her nightmares, which are strikingly similar to Jesse's. Small fires happen around the house, which culminates in the spontaneous combustion of their pet birds. Jesse's father accuses him of sabotage.

The following night, Jesse has a nightmare where he encounters Freddy, who tells him to kill for him. The dreams grow more intense and Jesse unsuccessfully attempts different measures to keep himself awake. He eventually begins wandering the streets at night. One night, he is caught by Schneider ordering a drink in a gay bar and is made to run laps at school as punishment. After sending Jesse to the showers, Schneider is attacked by an unseen force that drags him to the showers. Jesse vanishes into the steam and Freddy emerges, killing Schneider by slashing his back. Afterwards, Jesse is horrified to see the glove on his hand. He is escorted home by police after being found wandering the streets naked, and his parents begin to suspect that Jesse may be on drugs or mentally disturbed. Lisa takes Jesse to an abandoned factory where Freddy Krueger worked, but they find nothing there.

The following night, Jesse goes to Lisa's pool party and kisses her in the cabana, but his body begins to change and he leaves in a panic. He goes to Grady's house, confesses to killing Schneider, and instructs Grady to watch him as he sleeps and to stop him if he tries to leave. When Grady eventually falls asleep, Freddy emerges from Jesse's body and kills Grady. Freddy then changes back to Jesse, who finds himself looking at Freddy's laughing reflection in Grady's mirror. He flees before Grady's parents enter the room. Returning to Lisa's house, Jesse tells her what is going on. Lisa realizes that Jesse's terror is giving Freddy his strength, but he cannot stop fearing him and transforms again. Freddy locks Lisa's parents in their bedroom and attacks her, but realizes he cannot harm her due to Jesse's influence. Freddy goes outside where he begins to slaughter the partygoers. Lisa's father emerges with a shotgun, but Lisa stops him from shooting Freddy, who escapes in a ball of flame.

Lisa drives to the factory, facing sudden nightmares and having to control her fear before confronting Freddy. She pleads with Jesse to fight Freddy, but Freddy's hold is too strong. When Lisa confesses her love for Jesse and kisses Freddy, Jesse begins to fight back. Freddy combusts and turns to ash, from which Jesse emerges.

Later, as Jesse, Lisa, and Lisa's friend Kerry are taking the bus to school. Jesse begins to notice similarities to his original nightmare and panics. After Lisa calms Jesse down, Kerry says that it is all over just before Freddy's clawed arm bursts through her chest. Freddy laughs as the bus drives into the field, just as in Jesse's first nightmare.

Cast

 Mark Patton as Jesse Walsh
 Kim Myers as Lisa Webber
 Robert Rusler as Ron Grady
 Clu Gulager as Ken Walsh
 Hope Lange as Cheryl Walsh
 Marshall Bell as Coach Schneider
 Melinda O. Fee as Mrs. Webber
 Tom McFadden as Mr. Webber
 Sydney Walsh as Kerry Hellman
 Robert Englund as Freddy Krueger
 Edward Blackoff as Biology Teacher
 Christie Clark as Angela
 Lyman Ward as Mr. Grady

Production

Development
Pre-production for A Nightmare on Elm Street 2 began in April 1985. Screenwriter Leslie Bohem pitched the producers with his idea of using pregnancy and possession as a plot device for the second film: "My concept was a homage to Rosemary's Baby. I came up with a plot that had a new family move into the house, a teenage boy, his pregnant mother and a stepfather the boy didn't get along with. It was a real bloody, scary idea, much more physical and realistic because the dream reality stuff was less central to these movies then. My story was more of a possession scenario with Freddy getting inside the mother's womb, controlling the fetus. But New Line passed on it because [executive] Sara Risher was pregnant at the time, and I understand the idea upset her. So they went with David Chaskin's concept instead."

Though both films ended up using the spirit possession concept, the pregnancy idea would eventually be used in the sequel A Nightmare on Elm Street 5: The Dream Child, which Bohem would write the script for.

Robert Shaye offered Wes Craven the chance to direct again, but he turned down the offer since he had many problems with the script, such as the "possessed parakeet" that seemed very ridiculous to him, and of Freddy merging with the main character and manifesting in real life at the pool party to kill scores of teenagers of which many are bigger than him, which Craven thought would diminish Freddy's scare factor as Robert Englund is not very tall in stature.

Jack Sholder, who had previously written and directed Alone in the Dark for New Line was offered to direct. In a 2020 interview he explained that he had "no interest in making horror films" and that his initial feeling was to turn Robert Shaye down. After realizing that A Nightmare on Elm Street Part 2: Freddy's Revenge could put him on the map as a director, he said yes.

The intro scene with Jesse's nightmare of Freddy driving the bus was carried over from the previous film; Craven was vehemently against Freddy appearing in person as the driver of the car in the epilogue scene, as he felt the storyline for Nancy, Tina, Rod and Glen should be self-contained in the first film. The compromise between him and Shaye was therefore to use the idea of Freddy driving the vehicle for the sequel, but not for any characters from Craven's film. The character of Lisa Webber was named Lisa Poletti in the script. On Wes Craven's suggestions, Chaskin put more emphasis on Lisa in the film than he originally intended; he explains that Craven "suggested that we shift the focus from Jesse the male lead. In the script the focus was on Jesse for 90% of the film, then suddenly it shifted to Lisa, his girlfriend. I pretty much added some focus on Lisa, and now it's like 50-50."

Casting
New Line Cinema originally thought to save money by simply using an unnamed extra in a rubber mask to play Freddy - as had been the case for masked, mute, impersonal killers like Jason Voorhees and Michael Myers - but reconsidered when they realized that the man had the gait and posture of "a dimestore monster" or "Frankenstein's monster" as opposed to Robert Englund's classically trained physical acting. The extra as Freddy still remained in one scene left in the film, during coach Schneider's death scene in the shower, though obscured by excessive water steam. Realizing their mistake, the producers quickly brought back Englund for the rest of the film and series. Robert Shaye, head of New Line Cinema, wanted to play the role of Ron Grady's father but was denied by director Jack Sholder who gave him the non-speaking role of the bartender at the S&M bar that Jesse visits. Shaye would later recall in Never Sleep Again that his leather outfit was purchased from LA Store The Pleasure Chest.

Filming
Principal photography commenced in June 1985. Director Jack Sholder said in an interview he "had very little time to prepare" and that the movie contained "a lot of special effects, none of which I knew how to do". The film's special effects were headed by Kevin Yagher, who handled Freddy's design, and Mark Shostrom, who was responsible for the transformation effects wherein Freddy comes out of Jesse's body. David B. Miller, who created the makeup for the original film, was busy working on Cocoon and My Science Project. In a later interview, Yagher expressed disappointment and confusion regarding the ending of the film.

Music

The film's score was composed by Christopher Young. The song "Have You Ever Seen a Dream Walking" performed by Bing Crosby plays over the film's end credits. The songs "Touch Me (All Night Long)" by Fonda Rae, "Whisper to a Scream" by Bobby Orlando, "On the Air Tonight" by Willy Finlayson, "Moving in the Night" by Skagerack, and "Terror in My Heart" by the Reds are also featured in the film.

Reception

Box office
The film opened on 522 screens in the New York, Washington D.C., Detroit and Texas areas. Varying figures have been reported for its opening weekend. Daily Variety reported it opening with $3,865,475 placing it second for the weekend behind Death Wish 3. An advert in the following day's Weekly Variety claimed it had grossed $3,220,348 placing it third behind To Live and Die in L.A. and contemporary websites such as Box Office Mojo report it grossing exactly $1 million less than the initial Daily Variety figure, with only $2.9 million, coming in fourth place. Whichever figure is used, the per screen total was higher than the other films in the top 10. The following weekend, it grossed $1,819,203 for a 10-day total of $5,569,334 (which New Line also reported in an advertisement), which indicates that the initial figure reported by Daily Variety was overstated. In the US, the film eventually made $30 million on a budget of $3 million.

Critical response

Critical reaction of the film was mixed upon release, with some criticism in comparison to its predecessor. Janet Maslin of The New York Times praised the film, saying that it has "clever special effects, a good leading performance and a villain so chatty he practically makes this a human-interest story". The review also gave the lead performances positive reviews, noting, "Mr. Patton and Miss Myers make likable teen-age heroes, and Mr. Englund actually turns Freddy into a welcome presence. Clu Gulager and Hope Lange have some good moments as Jesse's parents, and Marshall Bell scowls ferociously as the coach who calls his charges dirtballs and who is eventually attacked by a demonic towel." Variety gave the film a positive review saying, "Episodic treatment is punched up by an imaginative series of special effects. The standout is a grisly chest-burster setpiece." In a negative review, People called the film a "tedious, humorless mess".

On review aggregator Rotten Tomatoes the film has an approval rating of 42% based on 31 reviews. The site's consensus is: "An intriguing subtext of repressed sexuality gives Freddy's Revenge some texture, but the Nightmare loses its edge in a sequel that lacks convincing performances or memorable scares." On Metacritic the film has a score of 43% based on reviews from 6 critics.

Homoerotic subtext
Film commentators have often remarked on the film's perceived homoerotic theme, claiming its subtext suggests Jesse is a repressed homosexual. They note, in particular, the scenes where he encounters his gym teacher at a fetish club, and his flight to a male friend's house after he attempts to make out with his girlfriend at her pool party. Further, actor Mark Patton, who plays Jesse, played a role so often written as female in the subgenre (such as in the first film) that it has become known as the "final girl". At the time of its release, one publication referred to it as "the gayest horror film ever". In the 21st century, it has become a cult film for gay audiences. On Never Sleep Again: The Elm Street Legacy, David Chaskin refers to a 2009 list on Cracked.com which lists "The 5 Most Unintentionally Gay Horror Movies", with Freddy's Revenge as number one, and states that "There is nothing logical that can explain the level of homoeroticism in this movie".

The book Welcome to Our Nightmares: Behind the Scene with Today's Horror Actors elaborates on the film's homoerotic subtext, stating that: "The film suggested an undertone of homosexuality, starting with the protagonist's gender-neutral name. Jesse's rarely fully clothed. He and a tormentor have a sweaty wrestling match. His coach, clad in leather, basically hits on him in a gay bar, then gets killed by Freddy, including a bare-ass spanking. Freddy emerges from Jesse's stomach in the same forced-birth technique that made the Alien films legendary."

Mark Patton has claimed the film's gay subtext was increasingly emphasised through script rewrites as production progressed. "It just became undeniable" he told BuzzFeed in 2016. "I'm lying in bed and I'm a pietà and the candles are dripping and they're bending like phalluses and white wax is dripping all over. It's like I'm the center of a [...] bukkake video." He has felt betrayed since he knew the filmmakers were aware he was gay, but closeted. They had considerable leverage over him in having him perform a role that, combined with his performance as a gay teen in Come Back to the Five and Dime, Jimmy Dean, Jimmy Dean the year before, led to him being typecast as gay. The role called attention to what he was trying to avoid discussing and would have forestalled him getting any significant roles in 1980s Hollywood.

In particular, Patton blames Chaskin, who he says claimed the subtext arose from how Patton played the part. "I love when [he] uses the word 'subtext,'" he complained. "Did you actually go to a freshman English course in high school? This is not subtext." In 2016 he said Chaskin "sabotage[d]" him. "Nobody ever affected my confidence—the boys that threw rocks at me, nobody—but this man did." Chaskin denied for years that there was a gay subtext in his screenplay. Instead, at one point, he told a reporter that Patton had simply played the part "too gay". The emotional stress of the film led Patton to leave acting shortly afterwards for a career in interior decorating.

While Chaskin has tried to reach out and apologize to Patton over the years, with limited success, he maintains that Patton's "interpretations of Jesse were choices that he made ... I have to believe that he 'got it' and that was how he decided to play it." In 2010, Chaskin finally admitted it was a deliberate choice on his part. "Homophobia was skyrocketing and I began to think about our core audience—adolescent boys—and how all of this stuff might be trickling down into their psyches," he explained. "My thought was that tapping into that angst would give an extra edge to the horror."

One scene that would have made the gay subtext more apparent was toned down. Englund was actually prepared to insert one of his hand's knife blades into Jessie's mouth instead of merely caressing his lips with it as he does in the finished film, but Patton did not feel comfortable with it. The film's makeup artist suggested to Patton that he not do the scene that way to protect his image.

In a February 2010 interview with Attitude magazine, Englund said "... the second Nightmare on Elm Street is obviously intended as a bisexual themed film. It was early '80s, pre-AIDS paranoia. Jesse's wrestling with whether to come out or not and his own sexual desires was manifested by Freddy. His friend is the object of his affection. That's all there in that film. We did it subtly but the casting of Mark Patton was intentional too, because Mark was out and had done Come Back to the Five and Dime, Jimmy Dean, Jimmy Dean."

In an article written by Brent Hartinger for AfterElton.com, he notes that a "frequent debate in gay pop culture circles is this: Just how 'gay' was 1985's A Nightmare on Elm Street 2: Freddy's Revenge (the first Elm Street sequel)? The imagery in the movie makes it seem unmistakably gay — but the filmmakers have all along denied that that was their intention." During his interview segment for the 2010 documentary film Never Sleep Again: The Elm Street Legacy, David Chaskin admitted that the gay themes were intentional, something he had denied until that point.

In a 2020 interview director Jack Sholder said he never had any discussions with Chaskin or anybody at New Line about a gay subtext in the script during production. He did add that in his view the movie was about "repressed sexual angst that every teenager experiences" and that "that angst can express itself in the question: Am I gay?". He also pointed out that Mark Patton did not pick up on any gay subtext when he read the script, but that it was pointed out to him by one of the crew members. Sholder concluded by saying: "Looking back on it, there were a whole bunch of decisions, starting with casting Mark that really… If you look at some of the exegeses as to why it’s the gayest horror film of all time, some of it is people reading stuff into things, some of it was intentional and some of it was stuff that people added that fed into that idea."

Others in the cast and crew have said that they were unaware of any such themes at the time they made the film, but that a series of creative decisions on the part of director Jack Sholder unintentionally brought Chaskin's themes to the forefront. In an interview Sholder said, "I simply didn't have the self-awareness to realize that any of this might be interpreted as gay". Now-out Mark Patton said, "I don't think that [the character] Jesse was originally written as a gay character. I think it's something that happened along the line by serendipity". Patton also wrote Jesse's Lost Journal about Jesse's life after the film and dealing with his homosexuality.

In 2019, Patton produced and starred in the documentary film Scream, Queen! My Nightmare on Elm Street, which focuses on the legacy of Freddy's Revenge and how it affected him.

See also
 List of ghost films
 List of monster movies

References

External links

 
 
 
 
 

1985 films
1985 horror films
1985 independent films
1985 LGBT-related films
1980s serial killer films
Nightmare Elm Street 2
1980s teen horror films
Adaptations of works by Wes Craven
American independent films
American sequel films
American serial killer films
American slasher films
American teen horror films
American teen LGBT-related films
1980s English-language films
Films about nightmares
American films about revenge
Films about spirit possession
Films directed by Jack Sholder
Films scored by Christopher Young
Films set in 1986
Films set in Ohio
Films shot in Los Angeles
Gay-related films
LGBT-related horror films
Insomnia in film
New Line Cinema films
A Nightmare on Elm Street (franchise) films
1980s American films
Male bisexuality in film